Joan Charmant (born 4 June 1978 in Bordeaux) is a retired French high jumper.

He finished fifth at the 2002 European Indoor Championships and won the silver medal at the 2003 Summer Universiade He also competed at the 2004 World Indoor Championships without reaching the final.

Charmant became French champion in 2003 and French indoor champion in 2004. His personal best was 2.24 metres, achieved in July 2003 in Narbonne. Indoors he had 2.28 metres, achieved in February 2004 in Aubière.

References

1978 births
Living people
French male high jumpers
Universiade medalists in athletics (track and field)
Universiade silver medalists for France
Medalists at the 2003 Summer Universiade
Sportspeople from Bordeaux
21st-century French people